The 2003 Scheldeprijs was the 90th edition of the Scheldeprijs cycle race and was held on 16 April 2003. The race was won by Ludovic Capelle of the Landbouwkrediet–Colnago team.

General classification

References

2003
2003 in road cycling
2003 in Belgian sport